Alexandru Florin "Alex" Bologa (born 7 November 1995) is a Romanian visually impaired Paralympic judoka. Competing in the 60-kg weight division he won bronze medals at the 2016 and 2020 Paralympics.

Bologa took up judo at school, aged 11. He has a degree in psychology from the Babeș-Bolyai University.

References

External links
 
 
 Bologa Florin-Alexandru at the Romanian Paralympic Committee 

1995 births
Living people
Romanian male judoka
Paralympic medalists for Romania
Paralympic medalists in judo
Visually impaired category Paralympic competitors
Judoka at the 2016 Summer Paralympics
Judoka at the 2020 Summer Paralympics
Medalists at the 2016 Summer Paralympics
Medalists at the 2020 Summer Paralympics
People from Zalău
20th-century Romanian people
21st-century Romanian people